Julio César Cruz González (born 23 November 1995) is a Mexican professional footballer for Liga FPD club San Carlos.

Honours
Individual
Liga de Expansión MX Golden Boot: Guardianes 2021

References

External links

1995 births
Living people
People from Minatitlán, Veracruz
Footballers from Veracruz
Association football forwards
Mexican footballers
C.F. Monterrey players
Belén F.C. players
C.S. Herediano footballers
Guadalupe F.C. players
C.S. Cartaginés players
A.D. San Carlos footballers
Liga MX players
Liga FPD players
Mexican expatriate footballers
Expatriate footballers in Costa Rica
Mexican expatriate sportspeople in Costa Rica